3/5 or  may refer to:

The fraction, 3/5
3/5 (album), a 1997 album by Les Savy Fav
March 5, month-day date notation
3 May, day-month date notation
3rd Battalion 5th Marines, an infantry battalion in the United States Marine Corps
Three-fifths Compromise, American legislation for determining the proportional value of slaves in pre-Civil War census counts 
Three-fifths majority, a supermajority used in some political votes

See also
6/10 (disambiguation)